The Encyclopedia of Iranian Old Music was published in Tehran by Mehran Poor Mandan in the year 2000.

References 

2000 non-fiction books
Encyclopedias of music
Persian encyclopedias
Iranian books
Iranian music
21st-century encyclopedias